Following is a list of senators of Tarn-et-Garonne, people who have represented the department of Tarn-et-Garonne in the Senate of France.

Third Republic

Senators for Tarn-et-Garonne under the French Third Republic were:

 André (Limairac) (1876)
 Paul (Preissac) (1876–1882)
 Isidore Delbreil (1876–1882)
 Henri Delbreil (1882–1891)
 Gustave Garrisson (1882–1897)
 Léon Rolland (1891–1912)
 Louis Bourgeat (1897–1902)
 Adrien Chabrié (1903–1909)
 Justin de Selves (1909–1927)
 Charles Caperan (1912–1920)
 Henri Pottevin (1920–1927)
 Auguste Puis (1927–1934)
 Roger Delthil (1927–1940)
 Léopold Presseq (1935–1940)

Fourth Republic

Senators for Tarn-et-Garonne under the French Fourth Republic were:

 Frédéric Cayrou (1946–1958)
 Roger Delthil (1948–1951)
 Jean Lacaze (1952–1959)
 Adrien Laplace (1958–1959)

Fifth Republic 
Senators for Tarn-et-Garonne under the French Fifth Republic:

References

Sources

 
Lists of members of the Senate (France) by department